AutoTheme is a HTML Theme System developed by Shawn McKenzie, written in PHP that currently supports the PHP-Nuke, PostNuke and MD-Pro Content Management Systems, osCommerce and CRE Loaded ecommerce applications and the WordPress blog.  AutoTheme can be used stand-alone to develop themed PHP applications or to provide HTML theme capabilities to custom or third-party PHP applications.

The free open-source AutoTheme AT-Lite is licensed under the GNU General Public License.

History
AutoTheme was born out of posts in the PostNuke forums from users that were frustrated with modifying their PostNuke sites and themes.  At that time, all themes were written in PHP and required a knowledge not only of PHP, but of PostNuke, its functions, API and interworkings.

The first beta of AutoTheme for PostNuke was released in October 2002 and for PHP-Nuke in December 2002.  The osCommerce and CRE Loaded versions were released in October 2004 and the WordPress version of AutoTheme was released in March 2006.

Features
 Supports PHP-Nuke, PostNuke, MD-Pro, osCommerce, CRE Loaded, WordPress
 HTML themes (PHP supported but not needed)
 Unlimited positions to display blocks or boxes
 Custom theme layout for each page
 Graphical administration interface
 Extras (plugins), such as search engine optimized URLs, custom entrance, login and logout pages, display specific themes based upon user's language, time of day or date and custom advertising pages.

Current development
The current version of AutoTheme is 1.77 and the current version of AT-Lite is .87.  Development is ongoing for the supported platforms, as well as Zen Cart, Mambo and Joomla.

External links
AutoTheme Official Website
Enterprise Sitecore Solutions

Free content management systems
Free software programmed in PHP